Shahrak-e Shahid Ali Chaab (also Romanized as Shahrak-e Shahīd ʿAlī Chaʿab) is a village in Elhayi Rural District, in the Central District of Ahvaz County, Khuzestan Province, Iran. In the 2006 census its population was 103, with 21 families.

References 

Populated places in Ahvaz County